David Augustus "Hoss" Amadio (April 23, 1939 – April 10, 1981) was a Canadian professional ice hockey player who played 125 games in the National Hockey League with the Los Angeles Kings and Detroit Red Wings between 1958 and 1969. The rest of his career, which lasted from 1958 to 1974, was spent in various minor leagues.

Early life 
Amadio was born in Glace Bay, Nova Scotia, and raised in Donkin, Nova Scotia.

Career 
Amadio spent much of his professional career, playing 500 games over eight seasons, with the Springfield Indians of the American Hockey League, including the team's Calder Cup championship in 1961–62. Amadio holds the AHL record for most goals by a defenseman in a game with five, scored against future Hockey Hall of Fame goaltender Gerry Cheevers and the Rochester Americans on February 8, 1964. Amadio scored the first two goals of the next night's match against the Pittsburgh Hornets, for a total of seven goals in less than 40 minutes of play; he only four other goals in the entire season.

Following his retirement as a player after the 1974 season, Amadio coached a single season for the Calgary Centennials of the Western Canada Hockey League.

Death 
Amadio died of a heart attack in 1981, less than two weeks shy of his 42nd birthday.

Career statistics

Regular season and playoffs

References

External links
 

1939 births
1981 deaths
Calgary Centennials coaches
Canadian ice hockey coaches
Canadian ice hockey defencemen
Denver Spurs (WHL) players
Detroit Red Wings players
Edmonton Flyers (WHL) players
Hamilton Tiger Cubs players
Hershey Bears players
Ice hockey people from Nova Scotia
Kansas City Blues players
Los Angeles Kings players
People from Glace Bay
Salt Lake Golden Eagles (WHL) players
Seattle Totems (WHL) players
Sportspeople from the Cape Breton Regional Municipality
Springfield Indians players
Springfield Kings players
Sudbury Wolves (EPHL) players